The 2014 Boyd Tinsley Women's Clay Court Classic was a professional tennis tournament played on outdoor clay courts. It was the thirteenth edition of the tournament and part of the 2014 ITF Women's Circuit, offering a total of $50,000 in prize money. It took place in Charlottesville, Virginia, United States, on April 21–27, 2014.

Singles main draw entrants

Seeds 

 1 Rankings as of April 14, 2014

Other entrants 
The following players received wildcards into the singles main draw:
  Julia Boserup
  Samantha Crawford
  Sanaz Marand
  Taylor Townsend

The following players received entry from the qualifying draw:
  Françoise Abanda
  Ulrikke Eikeri
  Montserrat González
  Sofiya Kovalets

Champions

Singles 

  Taylor Townsend def.  Montserrat González 6–2, 6–3

Doubles 

  Asia Muhammad /  Taylor Townsend def.  Irina Falconi /  Maria Sanchez 6–3, 6–1

External links 
 2014 Boyd Tinsley Women's Clay Court Classic at ITFtennis.com
 Official website

2014 ITF Women's Circuit
2014
2014
2014 in American tennis
Boyd Tinsley Women's Clay Court Classic
Tennis in Virginia
April 2014 sports events in the United States
Women in Virginia